The following is the list of squads that took place in the baseball tournament at the 1992 Summer Olympics.

Chinese Taipei
Chang Cheng-hsien 
Chang Wen-chung 
Chang Yaw-teing 
Chen Chi-hsin 
Chen Wei-chen 
Chiang Tai-chuan 
Huang Chung-yi 
Huang Wen-po 
Jong Yeu-jeng 
Ku Kuo-chian 
Kuo Lee Chien-Fu 
Liao Ming-hsiung 
Lin Chao-huang 
Lin Kun-han 
Lo Chen-jung 
Lo Kuo-chung 
Pai Kun-hong 
Tsai Ming-hung 
Wang Kuang-shih 
Wu Shih-hsin

Cuba
Omar Ajete 
Rolando Arrojo 
José Delgado 
Giorge Díaz 
José Antonio Estrada 
Osvaldo Fernández 
Lourdes Gourriel 
Orlando Hernández 
Alberto Hernández 
Orestes Kindelán 
Omar Linares 
Germán Mesa 
Víctor Mesa 
Antonio Pacheco 
Juan Padilla 
Juan Carlos Pérez Rondón 
Luis Ulacia 
Ermidelio Urrutia 
Jorge Luis Valdés 
Lázaro Vargas

Dominican Republic
Félix Nova 
José Ramón Veras 
Manuel Guzmán 
Fabio Aquino 
Roberto Casey 
Eugenio Valdez 
Rafaelito Mercedes 
Félix Tejada
Teófilo Peña 
Alexis Peña 
Fausto Peña
Teodoro Novas 
Cipriano Ventura 
Juan Sánchez 
Juan Viñas
Roque Solano 
Silvestre Popoteur  
Elías Olivos  
Benjamín Heredia  
José Santana

Italy
Massimo Ciaramella  
Guglielmo Trinci  
Claudio Cecconi  
Elio Gambuti  
Marco Ubani 
Maurizio De Sanctis 
Francesco Petruzzelli 
Fulvio Valle 
Massimiliano Masin 
Andrea Succi 
Claudio Taglienti 
Paolo Ceccaroli 
Ruggero Bagialemani 
Rolando Cretis 
Alberto D'Auria 
Roberto Bianchi 
Leonardo Schianchi 
Luigi Carrozza 
Massimo Fochi 
Massimo Melassi

Japan
Tomohito Ito 
Shinichiro Kawabata 
Masahito Kohiyama 
Hirotami Kojima 
Hiroki Kokubo 
Takashi Miwa 
Hiroshi Nakamoto 
Masafumi Nishi 
Kazutaka Nishiyama 
Koichi Oshima 
Hiroyuki Sakaguchi 
Shinichi Sato 
Yasuhiro Sato 
Masanori Sugiura 
Kento Sugiyama 
Yasunori Takami 
Akihiro Togo 
Koji Tokunaga 
Shigeki Wakabayashi 
Katsumi Watanabe

Puerto Rico
Abimael Rosario 
Albert Bracero 
Jorge Aranzamendi 
José Lorenzana 
Efraín Nieves 
Gualberto López 
Luis Ramos 
Wilfredo Vélez 
Manuel Serrano 
Ángel Morales 
James Figueroa 
Rafael Santiago 
Jesús Feliciano 
José Mateo 
Roberto López 
Efraín García 
Orlando López 
Nelson Rodríguez 
José Sepúlveda 
Silvio Censale

Spain
Manuel Martínez  
Jesús Lisarri  
Juan Pedro Belza  
Antonio Salazar  
Enrique Cortés  
Miguel Ángel Pariente  
José Arza  
Javier Díez  
Juan Damborenea  
Francisco Aristu  
Luis León  
Félix Cano  
Juan Manuel Salmerón  
Xavier Camps 
José María Pulido 
Miguel Stella 
Gabriel Valarezo 
José Luis Becerra 
Xavier Civit 
Óscar Rebolleda

United States
Willie Adams  
Jeff Alkire  
Darren Dreifort  
Nomar Garciaparra  
Jason Giambi  
Rick Greene  
Jeffrey Hammonds  
Rick Helling  
Charles Johnson  
Daron Kirkreit  
Chad McConnell  
Calvin Murray  
Phil Nevin  
Chris Roberts  
Michael Tucker  
Jason Varitek  
Ron Villone  
B. J. Wallace  
Craig Wilson  
Chris Wimmer

References

1992
Team squads